Gogo is a small genus of catfishes (order Siluriformes) of the family Anchariidae. It includes four species.

Gogo species are all endemic to freshwater rivers in eastern Madagascar; they are primarily found in highland habitats with clear, swift water.

Species 
There are currently four recognized species in this genus:
 Gogo arcuatus H. H. Ng & Sparks, 2005
 Gogo atratus H. H. Ng, Sparks & Loiselle, 2008
 Gogo brevibarbis (Boulenger, 1911)
 Gogo ornatus H. H. Ng & Sparks, 2005

References

Endemic fauna of Madagascar
Anchariidae
Catfish genera
Taxa named by Heok Hee Ng
Taxa named by John Stephen Sparks
Freshwater fish genera